Šaćir Džeko (born 25 January 1956) is a Yugoslav sports shooter. He competed in the men's 10 metre air rifle event at the 1984 Summer Olympics.

References

External links
 
 

1956 births
Living people
Yugoslav male sport shooters
Olympic shooters of Yugoslavia
Shooters at the 1984 Summer Olympics
Place of birth missing (living people)